Monochroa pentameris is a moth of the family Gelechiidae. It was described by Edward Meyrick in 1931. It is found on Honshu in Japan and Guangxi in China.

The wingspan is 8–9 mm. The forewings are white irrorated (sprinkled) with grey, the costa sometimes irrorated with blackish, with a blackish spot near the costa towards the base, and one in the disc beyond it, sometimes connected, the stigmata forming small black spots, the plical obliquely before the first discal. There are blackish spots on or near the costa at one-third and two-thirds. The apical area is more or less suffused with dark grey, with four small blackish-grey spots on the costa separated with whitish. The hindwings are grey.

References

Moths described in 1931
Monochroa